Laalach is 1983 Indian Hindi film directed by Shankar Nag starring Vinod Mehra, Bindiya Goswami, Ranjeet, Pran, Kajal Kiran and Anant Nag in lead roles. The film is a remake of director's own 1980 Kannada movie Minchina Ota.

Cast
 Vinod Mehra as Kishore
 Bindiya Goswami as Sarita
 Ranjeet as Shaikh Nabi Mohammed "Nabbu"
 Pran as David
 Anant Nag as DSP Saxena
 Kajal Kiran as Mrs. Sunita Saxena

Soundtrack
The film's soundtrack was composed by Bappi Lahiri and lyrics was penned by Anjaan.

References

External links 
 

1983 films
1980s Hindi-language films
Films scored by Bappi Lahiri
Hindi remakes of Kannada films
Films directed by Shankar Nag